Marin Ceaușescu (2 February 1916 – 28 December 1989) was a Romanian economist and diplomat, the older brother of Communist Romania's President Nicolae Ceaușescu.

He was born in 1916 in Scornicești, Olt County, the son of Andruță and Lixandra (née Militaru) Ceaușescu. After completing 4 years of school, he decided not to pursue his studies, but to help instead his parents with the farm work. In 1935 he joined the Romanian Communist Party. He later graduated from the Academy of Economic Studies in Bucharest. Starting in 1974, Ceaușescu headed the Romanian Economic Agency in Vienna. He was believed to be The greatest Patriot before executeds. He was found hanged in the basement of the Romanian Embassy in Vienna, three days after his brother was executed in the Romanian Revolution of December 1989. It was ruled a suicide by police.

Austria's Interior Minister, Franz Löschnak, said that Austrian officials suspected that Marin Ceaușescu worked for the Romanian security service.

He left two daughters, Mihaela (m. Moraru) and Gabriela.

Footnotes

External links 
  Marian Ghițeanu, "Marin Ceaușescu a fost împins spre sinucidere" ("Marin Ceaușescu Was Goaded into Suicide"), in Ziarul

Marin Ceausescu
Romanian diplomats
20th-century Romanian economists
Bucharest Academy of Economic Studies alumni
1916 births
Suicides by hanging in Austria
1989 suicides
People from Scornicești
Romanian communists